The 2016–17 Illinois Fighting Illini women's basketball team represented University of Illinois at Urbana–Champaign during the 2016–17 NCAA Division I women's basketball season. The Fighting Illini, led by fifth-year head coach Matt Bollant, played their home games at the State Farm Center as members of the Big Ten Conference. They finished the season 9–22, 3–13 in Big Ten play to finish in a four-way for 11th place. They advanced to the second round of the Big Ten women's tournament by beating Wisconsin before they lost to Purdue.

On March 14, 2017, head coach Matt Bollant was fired. He finished at Illinois with a five-year record of 61–94. On March 22, the school hired five-time Division III national champion and two-time Division III coach of the year recipient Nancy Fahey as head coach.

Roster

Schedule

|-
!colspan=9 style="background:#FF6600; color:#003C7D;"| Exhibition

|-
!colspan=9 style="background:#FF6600; color:#003C7D;"| Non-conference regular season

|-
!colspan=9 style="background:#FF6600; color:#003C7D;"| Big Ten regular season

|-
!colspan=9 style="background:#FF6600;"| Big Ten Women's Tournament

See also
2016–17 Illinois Fighting Illini men's basketball team

References

Illinois Fighting Illini women's basketball seasons
Illinois
Fight
Fight